Sarah Hawkshaw (born 4 November 1995) is an Ireland women's field hockey international. She has also played for Railway Union in the Women's Irish Hockey League and for UMass Minutewomen in the NCAA Division I Field Hockey Championship.

Early years, family and education
Hawkshaw is the daughter of Sean and Anne Hawkshaw. She has three brothers – Daniel, David and James. Her younger brother, David Hawkshaw, is an Ireland under-20 rugby union international and in  2019 he captained Ireland to a Grand Slam. Sarah Hawkshaw was educated at St Brigid's National School, Castleknock and at Mount Sackville. In addition to playing field hockey, in her youth Hawkshaw also played Gaelic football and competed as a cross country runner. She played Gaelic football for St Brigid's National School, St Brigid's GAA (Dublin) and Dublin at youth level. As a cross country runner, Hawkshaw represented both Mount Sackville and Clonliffe Harriers. Between 2014 and 2018 Hawkshaw attended the University of Massachusetts on a sports scholarship and gained a BS in Public Health Sciences.

Domestic teams

Mount Sackville
In 2013 Hawkshaw was a member of the Mount Sackville team that won the Leinster Schoolgirl's 
Senior Plate final. She scored the winner from a penalty corner as Mount Sackville defeated a St Gerard's School team featuring Elena Tice 2–1.

Leinster
Hawkshaw represented Leinster in interprovincial tournaments, playing at under-16, under-18 and  under-21 levels.

Railway Union
Together with Cecelia and Isobel Joyce, Emer Lucey, Kate McKenna and Grace O'Flanagan, Hawkshaw was a member of the Railway Union team that played in the 2014 EuroHockey Club Champions Cup. She subsequently left Railway Union to study at the University of Massachusetts. In 2018 she returned to Railway Union to play in the Women's Irish Hockey League.

UMass Minutewomen
Between 2014 and 2018, while attending the University of Massachusetts, Hawkshaw played for the UMass Minutewomen. She played for the  UMass Minutewomen in both the 2015 and 2016 NCAA Division I Field Hockey Championships.

Ireland international
In January 2019, Hawkshaw made her senior debut for Ireland against Chile. She had previously represented Ireland at under-16, under-18 and under-23 levels. She made her major tournament at the 2018–19 Women's FIH Series Finals. She subsequently represented Ireland at the 2019 Women's EuroHockey Nations Championship.

Tournaments

Goals

Employment
Since September 2018, Hawkshaw has worked as a field hockey coach at both The King's Hospital and Mount Sackville.

Honours
Ireland
FIH Hockey Series
Runners Up: 2018–19

References

External links
 Sarah Hawkshaw at Hockey Ireland
 
 
 
 

1995 births
Living people
Irish female field hockey players
Ireland international women's field hockey players
Irish field hockey coaches
Railway Union field hockey players
Women's Irish Hockey League players
Expatriate field hockey players
Irish expatriate sportspeople in the United States
UMass Minutewomen field hockey players
University of Massachusetts Amherst School of Public Health and Health Sciences alumni
Field hockey players from County Dublin
Female field hockey midfielders
Female field hockey forwards
Dublin ladies' Gaelic footballers
St Brigid's (Dublin) Gaelic footballers
Irish female cross country runners
Sportspeople from Fingal
Field hockey players at the 2020 Summer Olympics
Olympic field hockey players of Ireland